Alexander Eik (born 8 January 1972) is a Norwegian director, screenwriter, series creator, and executive producer.

References

External links

Norwegian film directors
1972 births
Living people
Place of birth missing (living people)